Assin District is a former district that was located in Central Region, Ghana. Originally created as an ordinary district assembly in 1988. However, in August 2004, it was split off into two new districts: Assin North District (now currently known as Assin Central Municipal District; capital: Assin Fosu) and Assin South District (capital: Nsuaem Kyekyewere). The district assembly was located in the northwest part of Central Region and had Assin Fosu as its capital town.

Sources

References

Central Region (Ghana)
Districts of the Central Region (Ghana)